Jemielnica (1945-47: Imielnica)  (German: Himmelwitz) is a village in Strzelce County, Opole Voivodeship, in south-western Poland. It is the seat of the gmina (administrative district) called Gmina Jemielnica.

The village has a population of 3,500. The village, as part of Gmina Jemielnica has been officially bilingual in Polish and German since 2006.

References

Villages in Strzelce County